Toni, Toñi or Tóni is a unisex given name.

In Spanish, Italian, Croatian and Finnish, it is a masculine given name used as a short form of the names derived from Antonius like Antonio, Ante or Anttoni. 

In Danish, English, Finnish, Norwegian and Swedish, it is a feminine given name used as a short form of Antonia.

In Bulgarian, it is a unisex name used as a diminutive form of both Antoniya and Anton.

Toñi is a Spanish feminine given name used as a short form of Antonia. 

Tóni a Hungarian masculine given name used as a diminutive form of Antal.

It is sometimes a short form (hypocorism) of other names, such as Antonio, Antoine, Antonia or Antoinette. It is also sometimes a surname. Notable people with this name include the following:

People

Women
 Toni Adams (1964–2010), American professional wrestling manager and valet
 Toni Arden (1924–2012), stage name of Antoinette Ardizzone, American traditional pop music singer
 Toni Aubin (1927–1990), American vocalist
 Toni Cade Bambara (1939–1995), African-American author, documentary filmmaker, social activist and college professor
 Toni Basil, stage name of American singer and actress Antonia Christina Basilotta (born 1943)
 Toni Braxton (born 1967), American singer-songwriter and actress
 Toni Blum (1918–1973), American writer
 Toni Carabillo (1926–1997), American graphic designer
 Toni Childs (born 1957), American singer-songwriter
 Toni Collette (born 1972), Australian actress
 Toni Cronk (born 1980), Australian field hockey goalkeeper
 Toni Darnay (1921–1983), American actress
 Toni Duggan (born 1991), English footballer
 Toni Edgar-Bruce (1892–1966), British actress
 Toni Elster (1861–1948), German painter
 Toni Fisher (1924–1999), American pop singer
 Toni Frissell (1907–1988), American photographer
 Antonia Toni Garrn (born 1992), German model
 Celestine Toni Gonzaga (born 1984), Filipino singer, television host, actress, and comedian
 Toni Grant (1942–2016), American psychologist
 Toni Halliday (born 1964), English singer-songwriter, half of the duo Curve
 Toni Harp, American politician
 Toni Jo Henry (1916–1942), American murderer
 Toni Kasim (1966–2008), Malaysian politician
 Toni Kelner, American mystery writer
 Toni Lander (1931–1985), Danish dancer
 Toni LaSelle (1901–2002), American artist
 Toni Lawrence (born 1976), convicted of criminal confinement in the torture-murder of Shanda Sharer
 Toni Mannix (1906–1983), American actress
 Toni McNaron (born 1937), American literary scholar and lesbian memoirist 
 Toni Mendez (1908–2003), American cartoonist
 Toni Morrison (1931–2019), pen name of Nobel Prize–winning American author, editor, and professor Chloe Ardelia Wofford
 Toni Packer (1927–2013), American writer and teacher
 Toni Rettaliata (1944–2020), American politician
 Toni Rothmund (1877–1956), German writer
 Toni Rodríguez (1969–2021), Mexican voice actress
 Toni Sender (1888–1964), German politician
 Toni Shaw (born 2003), British Paralympic swimmer
 Toni Stone (1921–1996), American baseball player
 Toni Tennille (born 1940), American singer-songwriter
 Toni Tetzlaff (1871–1947), German film actress
 Toni van Eyck (1910–1988), German film actress
 Toni von Bukovics (1882–1970), Austrian film actress
 Toni von Langsdorff (1884–1976), German doctor
 Toni Wolff (1888–1953), Swiss Jungian analyst

Men
 Toni (footballer, born 1946), António José Conceição Oliveira, Portuguese football coach and player
 Toni (footballer, born 1972), Nélson António Soares da Gama, Portuguese football striker
 Toni (footballer, born 1992), Antonio Rosa Ribeiro, Brazilian football midfielder
 Toni Androić (born 1991), Croatian tennis player
 Toni Dietl
 Toni Dijan (born 1983), Croatian basketball player
 Toni Eggert, German luger who has competed since 2008
 Toni Gardemeister (born 1975), Finnish rally driver
 Toni Gorupec (born 1993), Croatian footballer
 Antonio Toni Jiménez Sistachs (born 1970), Spanish football player and coach
 Toni Junnila (born 1984), Finnish footballer
 Toni Kallio (born 1978), Finnish footballer
 Toni Kolehmainen (born 1988), Finnish footballer
 Toni Korkeakunnas (born 1968), Finnish football player and manager
 Toni Kroos (born 1990), German footballer
 Toni Kuivasto (born 1975), Finnish footballer
 Toni Kukoč (born 1968), Croatian basketball player
 Toni Lechuga (born 1988), Spanish football player
 Toni Liias (born 1986), Finnish racing cyclist
 Antoni Lima Solá (born 1970), Andorran footballer
 António Pedro de Brito Lopes (born 1979), Portuguese footballer
 Toni Maalouf, Lebanese actor
 Toni Mascolo (1942–2017), British hairdresser and businessman, co-founder of Toni & Guy
 Toni Micevski (born 1970), Macedonian footballer
 Toni Müller (born 1984), Swiss curler
 Antonio Toni Nadal (born 1961), Spanish tennis coach, uncle and coach of Rafael Nadal
 Toni Nieminen (born 1975), Finnish ski jumper
 António Conceição da Silva Oliveira (born 1961), Portuguese football coach and player
 Anton Toni Prijon, West German 1980s slalom canoer
 Toni Prostran (born 1991), Croatian basketball player
 Toni Rakkaen (born 1982), Thai model, actor and hair stylist
 Toni Rocak (born 1999), Swiss basketball player
 Antonio Rodríguez Dovale (born 1990), Spanish footballer
 Anton Toni Sailer (1935–2009), Austrian skier
 Toni Savevski (born 1963), Macedonian footballer
 Anton Schumacher (born 1938), German footballer
 Harald Schumacher (born 1954), German footballer
 Toni Söderholm (born 1978), Finnish ice hockey player
 Toni Ståhl (born 1984), Finnish footballer
 Toni Šunjić (born 1988), Bosnian footballer
 Toni Tasev (born 1994), Bulgarian footballer
 Toni Tipurić (born 1990), Bosnian footballer
 Antonio Toni Ucci (1922–2014), Italian actor and comedian
 Toni Vastić (born 1993), Austrian footballer
 Toni Vilander (born 1980), Finnish race car driver
 Toni Wirtanen (born 1975), Finnish musician

Fictional characters
 Toni Cipriani, in the Grand Theft Auto series.
 Toni Daggert, on the British soap opera Emmerdale.
 Toni Topaz, in the American teen drama-mystery series Riverdale.
 Toni Warner, on the New Zealand soap opera Shortland Street.
 Toni Shalifoe, in the series The Wilds. 
 Toni Kensa, in the Splatoon series.

Surname
Lapalapa Toni (born 1994), Samoan footballer
Luca Toni (born 1977), Italian footballer 
Mauricio Toni (born 1998), Argentine footballer 
Swiss Toni, fictional used-car dealer played by Charlie Higson in The Fast Show

See also

Ton (disambiguation)
Tona (name)
Tonic Chabalala
Tonie
Tonio (name)
Tonni (name)

Notes

References

Feminine given names
Finnish masculine given names
Bulgarian masculine given names
Croatian masculine given names
Romanian masculine given names
Spanish masculine given names
Italian masculine given names
Macedonian masculine given names
Lists of people by nickname
Spanish-language hypocorisms